KUKU may refer to:

 KUKU-FM, a radio station (100.3 FM) licensed to Willow Springs, Missouri, United States
 KUKU (AM), a defunct radio station (1330 AM) formerly licensed to Willow Springs, Missouri
 The Cuckoo Hour, a 1930s’ radio comedy which took place at the titular KUKU